"The Train" is an early short story by the American author Flannery O'Connor. It is one of the six stories included in O'Connor's 1947 master's thesis The Geranium: A Collection of Short Stories and was published in The Sewanee Review in 1948. It later appeared in the 1971 collection The Complete Stories. O'Connor revised this story into the first chapter of her novel, Wise Blood.

"The Train" describes a young man, Hazel Wickers, as he boards a train home and his interactions with other passengers and an African American employee who he believes to be the son of someone in his hometown. The man denies this.

References

Short stories by Flannery O'Connor
1947 short stories
Southern Gothic short stories